Porostereum is a genus of poroid crust fungi in the family Phanerochaetaceae. It was circumscribed by Czech mycologist Albert Pilát in 1937.

Species
Porostereum phellodendri Pilát (1937)
Porostereum sharpianum (A.L.Welden) Hjortstam & Ryvarden (1990)
Porostereum spadiceum (Pers.) Hjortstam & Ryvarden (1990)
Porostereum umbrinoalutaceum (Wakef.) Hjortstam & Ryvarden (1990)

References

Phanerochaetaceae
Polyporales genera
Taxa described in 1937